The Trade Union Congress of the Philippines (TUCP) is the largest national trade union center in the Philippines. Founded in 1975 by labor leader Democrito Mendoza, TUCP is affiliated with the International Confederation of Free Trade Unions and the International Trade Union Confederation.
During the 1980s it was funded with 5.7 million dollars from the United States Congress through the National Endowment for Democracy.

References

National trade-union centers of the Philippines
International Trade Union Confederation
Trade unions established in 1975